Glenda R. Taylor (born December 30, 1955) is an American author and cultural historian.

Biography
Glenda R. Taylor was born in 1955 in Brooklyn, New York. She is a graduate of Medgar Evers College of the City University of New York, and also studied at the University of Ghana's Institute of African Studies in Accra, Ghana; the University of Science and Technology in Kumasi, Ghana; and Brooklyn College of the City University of New York. 

Taylor is the founder of Olympic Vision, a charitable organization, which seeks to provide youth and adults with educational, job placement, mental health and social services. She is a proponent of the John Dewey philosophy which emphasizes the importance of experience in education. organizations and small businesses.

Taylor is the editor of The Secrets of Success: Quotations by African American Achievers and co-editor of The Secrets of Success: The Black Man’s Perspective (New York Network Journal). Her most recent book (co-edited with Mary J. Taylor) is titled, "Truth Beyond Illusion:African American Women 1860s-1950s". Taylor has received a Certificate for Outstanding Service to Youth from the New York State Division for Youth, and is one of the first recipients of the Network Journal's 25 Most Influential Women In Business Award. In 2005, Taylor received the Harriett Tubman Award for her contribution to the non-profit sector.

References
Ramirez, Anthony. “Black Collectors Hate and Buy Them. “The New York Times,” July 5, 2006.  
“Glenda Taylor Shares ‘The Secrets of Success’.” The New York Daily Challenge, January 25, 1999.
“Glenda R. Taylor CEO & Founder, Olympic Vision.” The New York Network Journal, March 1999.
“Community Calendar: Employment Training Program.” New York Beacon, September 10, 1998.
“Education Today: Summer Youth-employment Classes.” The New York Amsterdam News, April 2, 1998.
“Bebe Moore Campbell Brings Book Tour to New York.” New York Daily challenge, March 4, 1998.
"Iyanla Vanzant ‘empowers’ Olympic Vision Staff.” New York Daily Challenge, March 24, 1998.
“Olympic Vision Co-hosts Reading, Book Signing by Author Walter Mosley.” New York Daily Challenge, November 13, 1997.
“Olympic Vision Hosts 3rd Annual Fundraising Drive for Adult Training.” New York Daily Challenge, August 6, 1996.
“Olympic Vision Benefit Holds its first Event.” The New York Amsterdam News, May 27, 1995.

1955 births
American women writers
Living people
20th-century American writers
21st-century American writers
21st-century American women writers
20th-century American women writers